Palanpur is one of the 182 Legislative Assembly constituencies of Gujarat state in India. It is part of Banaskantha district.It is numbered as 12-Palanpur.

List of segments
This assembly seat represents the following segments,

 Palanpur Taluka (Part) Villages – Gadalwada(Galwada), Surajpura, Ranawas, Juvol, Chekhala, Rampura (Karaza), Bhatamal Nani, Akedi, Badarpura (Bhutedi), Vadhana, Madana (Dangiya), Kotda (Bhakhar), Mota, Chandisar, Kushakal, Delwada, Rajpur (Pakhanva), Bhutedi, Sangla, Bhatamal Moti, Antroli, Pirojpura (Tankani), Kotda (Chand Gadh), Chitrasani, Ranpuriya, Ukarda, Malpuriya, Jaspuriya, Hebatpur, Malana, Pakhanwa, Moriya, Lunwa, Varwadia, Khemana, Sangra, Laxmanpura, Hasanpur, Merwada (Mahajan), Pedagara, Malan, Vasda (Fatepur), Manpur (Karjoda), Asmapura (Karjoda), Karjoda, Songadh, Parpada, Angola, Badarpura (Parpada), Badarpura (Khodla), Khodla, Kumbhalmer, Sundha, Samdhi Ranajivas, Samdhi (Motavas), Samdhi (Nadhanivas), Vasani, Kumbhasan, Vedancha, Akesan, Chadotar, Sadarpur, Aligadh, Vasda (Mujpur), Nalasar, Ambaliyal, Jadial, Bhatwadi, Vasan, Bhagal (Pipli), Dhaniyana, Ambetha, Virpur, Ratanpur, Gathaman, Bhavisana, Salempura, Gadh, Talepura (Madana), Dalwada, Madana (Gadh), Esbipura, Lalawada, Sambarda, Pipli, Gopalpura, Ruppura, Palanpur (M), Palanpur (Rural).

Members of Legislative Assembly
 2007 - Govind Prajapati, Bharatiya Janata Party
 2012 - Maheshkumar Patel, Indian National Congress

Election results

2022

2017

2012

2007

See also
 List of constituencies of the Gujarat Legislative Assembly
 Banaskantha district

References

External links
 

Assembly constituencies of Gujarat
Politics of Banaskantha district